Keshmiri (Persian: کشمیری) is an Iranian surname. Notable people with this surname include:
 Jalal Keshmiri (1939–1999), Iranian shot putter and discus thrower
 Kamy Keshmiri (born 1969), American discus thrower, son of Jalal
 Masoud Keshmiri, Iranian politician and terrorist

Persian-language surnames